Timothy Christian Senior (born March 22, 1960) is an American prelate of the Roman Catholic Church. He is currently serving as an auxiliary bishop of the Archdiocese of Philadelphia, as well as rector of St. Charles Borromeo Seminary.

Biography

Early life and education
Timothy Senior was born in North Wales, Pennsylvania, to James Harwood (d. 1977) and Elise (née Rothwell) Senior. The youngest of three children, he has a brother, Jim, and a sister, Myra. He attended St. Rose of Lima Elementary School and graduated from Lansdale Catholic High School in 1977. He then studied at St. Charles Borromeo Seminary in Overbrook, Pennsylvania, obtaining a Bachelor of Philosophy degree in 1981.

Ordination and ministry
Senior was ordained to the priesthood for the Archdiocese of Philadelphia by Cardinal John Krol on May 18, 1985.  After his ordination, Senior was appointed parochial vicar at Assumption of the Blessed Virgin Mary Parish in Feasterville, Pennsylvania, serving there until 1988. He earned Master of Divinity and Master of Arts in pastoral theology degrees from St. Charles Seminary in 1988.

Senior briefly taught religion at Archbishop Kennedy High School in Conshohocken, Pennsylvania, (1988–89) before pursuing full-time graduate studies at Boston College.  He received a Master of Social Work degree and Master of Business Administration in 1992. During his studies, Senior also worked as executive assistant to the secretary for social services in the Archdiocese of Boston (1991–92).

On returning to Philadelphia, Senior worked as deputy secretary for Catholic Human Services from 1992 to 1997, when he became secretary. In this position, he oversaw the governance and operation of the network of Catholic health care and social services ministries sponsored by the archdiocese. Senior was raised to the rank of chaplain to his holiness by Pope John Paul II in 1998, and prelate of honor in 2005.In 2004, Senior was named archdiocesan vicar for clergy by Cardinal Justin Rigali. In addition to his duties as vicar, he resided at and served as chaplain at Divine Providence Village, a facility for people with intellectual disabilities, in Springfield, Pennsylvania.

Auxiliary Bishop of Philadelphia
On June 8, 2009, Senior was appointed as auxiliary bishop of the Archdiocese of Philadelphia and titular bishop of Floriana by Pope Benedict XVI. Senior's appointment was made three weeks after the pope named Bishop Joseph R. Cistone as bishop of the Diocese of Saginaw. Senior received his episcopal consecration on July 31, 2009, from Cardinal Rigali, with Bishops Michael Bransfield and Daniel E. Thomas  serving as co-consecrators, at the Cathedral Basilica of Ss. Peter and Paul in Philadelphia.

See also

 Catholic Church hierarchy
 Catholic Church in the United States
 Historical list of the Catholic bishops of the United States
 List of the Catholic bishops of the United States
 Lists of patriarchs, archbishops, and bishops

References

External links

 Roman Catholic Archdiocese of Philadelphia Official Site

Episcopal succession

1960 births
Living people
21st-century American Roman Catholic titular bishops
People from Montgomery County, Pennsylvania
St. Charles Borromeo Seminary alumni
Catholics from Pennsylvania